Thomas Lawrence Higgins (June 17, 1950 - November 10, 1994) was an American writer and gay rights activist, who is credited with coining the term gay pride. He is best known for pieing anti-gay activist Anita Bryant on live television.

Early life
Higgins was born in Beaver Dam, Wisconsin. He attended Catholic elementary school in Minnesota as well as Catholic high schools in Minnesota and North Dakota, before being accepted to the University of North Dakota in 1967 to study in journalism and theater, before he was suspended in 1968 for his involvement in an underground student publication called Snow Job.

Career and Activism
In 1969 Higgins became the first person in Minnesota to be granted conscientious objector status from the Vietnam War. Around this time he joined the Fight Repression of Erotic Expression (FREE), where he is credited with coining the term gay pride. He was terminated from his job at the State Radio Services for the Blind as a result of his affiliation with FREE. In response FREE picketed his former workplace, protesting for anti-discrimination protections.

On October 14, 1977, Higgins and Bruce Brockway attended a televised pre-concert press conference hosted by actress Anita Bryant, who answering questions about her plan to open a network of Anita Bryant Centers where "homosexuals could go for rehabilitation." During the conference Higgins got up, and pushed a banana cream pie into Bryant's face. Afterwards he and four companions exited the studio to answer questions for the media. Bryant's husband Bob Green noticed one of them holding an unused pie, and pressed it into his face in retalliation. Criminal charges were not filed against Higgins.

In 1980 Higgins and his friend Bruce Brockway founded the Positively Gay Cuban Refugee Task, in response to an influx of refugees fleeing Cuba. Among these refugees were gay men, who faced legal persecution in their home country. They were all housed in refugee camps, and were unable to leave without an American sponsor. The organization helped mobilize Minneapolis's gay community to sponsor gay refugees, and allow them to leave and resettle.

Death
Higgins died on November 10, 1994. He is buried in Roseville, Minnesota.

References

LGBT rights activists
1950 births
1994 deaths